This is a list of Serbian regions by GDP, GDP per capita and GVA. 

Data for 2018 estimates (international US$ using 2018 PPP conversion factor from the International Monetary Fund).

Regions by GDP 
Regions of Serbia by GDP in 2018 according to data by the Statistical Office of the Republic of Serbia.

Regions by GDP per capita 
Regions of Serbia by GDP in 2018 according to data by the Statistical Office of the Republic of Serbia.

Districts by GDP (PPS) per inhabitant 
Districts of Serbia by GDP (PPS) per inhabitant in 2018 according to data by the Eurostat.

Districts by GVA and GVA per capita 
Districts of Serbia by Gross value added (GDP + Subsidies on products - Taxes on products) and Gross value added per capita in 2018 according to data by the Statistical Office of the Republic of Serbia.

References 

Serbian regions by GDP

GDP
Serbia